Lima Cahaya is a multi-outlet department store in the city of Banjarmasin, South Kalimantan, Indonesia. Its name literally means "five lights".

History 

Lima Cahaya first store opened at 1966 was located along the stretch of Jl. Taman Sari at 1966.
It moved to large location at Jl. Pangeran Samudera at 1974 and became the centre of fashion in the area of Banjarmasin.
It opened another outlet at Jl Ahmad Yani at 1998 with an integrated MiniMarket at its ground level.

Influence on region 

Lima Cahaya positively influenced the region by introducing most major fashion brands to the provinces of South Kalimantan and Central Kalimantan.

Stores
 Ahmad Yani: Jl. A. Yani km 5,5 no 416
 Pangeran Samudera: Jl. Pangeran Samudera no 143-145

Pictures

References 
http://wikimapia.org/11479930/id/LIMA-CAHAYA-dan-Pertokoan-Sudimampir

http://banjarmasin.loveindonesia.com/shopping/detail.php?id=59500:lima-cahaya-pasaraya

Department stores of Indonesia
Retail companies established in 1966
Buildings and structures in South Kalimantan
Indonesian companies established in 1966
Indonesian brands